Newcomb Lake is a  natural lake in the Adirondack Park in the town of Newcomb, New York; it is the site of the historic Adirondack Great Camp, Camp Santanoni.  It is accessible via a five-mile foot trail from New York State Route 28N.  There are six campsites and two leantos maintained by the state.

Sources
 New York State Department of Environmental Conservation: Newcomb Lake (pdf) 
 New York State Department of Environmental Conservation: Camp Santanoni Historic Area

Lakes of New York (state)
Lakes of Essex County, New York